Coleophora parasymi is a moth of the family Coleophoridae. It is found in the lower Volga area in southern Russia.

The larvae feed on Kochia prostrata.

References

parasymi
Moths of Europe
Moths described in 2005